We and Our Mountains is a 1969 Armenian comedy film directed by Henrik Malyan and starring Azat Sherents, Frunzik Mkrtchyan and Sos Sargsyan. It is widely considered to be one of the best Armenian films ever made.

Plot
The film revolves around a comical story of four unlucky shepherds living high in the mountains of Armenia. One day for dinner they have a feast of the neighbour's sheep, which had come to their flock. The shepherds easily agree on ransom with the former master of the sheep. However, a serious young policeman, despite the protests of his friends, starts a case of embezzlement of sheep and tries to give the incident an official move,  interfering with a profitable deal.

Cast 

 Frunzik Mkrtchyan – Ishkhan
 Azat Sherents – Avak
 Sos Sargsyan – Lieutenant
 Khoren Abrahamyan – Pavel
 Armen Ayvazyan – Zaven
 Artavazd Peleshyan – Revaz

References

External links
 We and Our Mountains on YouTube
 

1969 comedy films
1969 films
Films directed by Henrik Malyan
Soviet-era Armenian films
Armenfilm films
Soviet comedy films
Armenian comedy films
Armenian-language films